The Vintage V100MRPGM Lemon Drop is a Gibson Les Paul-style solid-body electric guitar, designed by Trevor Wilkinson for Vintage in 2006. The Vintage "Lemon Drop" is influenced by the look and sound of English guitarist Peter Green's legendary Gibson Les Paul (later purchased by Irish guitarist Gary Moore directly from Green and now owned by Kirk Hammett of Metallica). On Green's guitar, the neck pickup was fitted backwards and wired out of phase; the V100MRPGM's pickups were voiced to imitate that specific tonal quality, and the pickups are wired to be out of phase when the selector switch is set to the middle position.

External links
 Review Vintage "Lemon Drop" (Guitar and Bass, December 2006).
 Vintage Electric Guitars.
 Vintage V100 Lemon Drop

Electric guitars